All Saints’ Church, Pavement, York is a Grade I listed parish church in the Church of England in York. Services are from the Book of Common Prayer.

History

The church dates from the 14th century. The chancel was demolished in 1780 and the east end was rebuilt. The north wall and the west end were rebuilt in 1834.

The lantern was rebuilt in 1837. The vestry was added between 1850 and 1855. The church was restored in 1887 by George Edmund Street when the stonework was cleaned, the pinnacles restored, and the central east window fitted with stained glass by Charles Eamer Kempe.

It was enlarged in 1912.

The church is the guild and civic church for the city of York, and the regimental church for the Royal Dragoon Guards.

In 1954 the church was united with the parish of St Saviour's Church, York when St Saviour's Church was declared redundant.

Memorials
Sergeant Major John Polety (d. 1829)
Charles Polety (d. 1838)
Tate Wilkinson (d. 1803)
Jane Wilkinson (d. 1826)
Sir Robert Crathorn (d. 1482)
Robert Askwith (d. 1579) (originally in St Crux's Church, York)
Roger de Moreton (d. 1382)
Isabella de Moreton (d. 1412) (originally in St Saviour's Church, York)
Ursula Wyvill (d. 1790)
Robert Bishopricke Surgeon (d. 1814)
Henry Richards (d. 1783)

Organ

A specification of the organ can be found on the National Pipe Organ Register.

References

All Saints
All Saints
14th-century church buildings in England